Nikita Arkadievich Boriso-Glebsky (born 30 August 1985) is a Russian violinist, soloist of the Moscow Philharmonic Society, and winner of international music contests. He represented  at the Eurovision Young Musicians 2002, failing to qualify for the final which took place on 19 June 2002, in Berlin, Germany.

Early life 
Nikita Boriso-Glebsky was born in Volgodonsk, Southern Russia, in 1985. His parents work as chemists. Boriso-Glebsky started his musical instruments training at the age of six. He took up piano lessons first but then decided to play violin after starting school. At the age of ten, he performed with the Rostov Philharmonic Orchestra the Violin Concert No. 22 by Gioivanni Viotti.

At the age of fourteen Boriso-Glebsky graduated to the Moscow State Tchaikovsky Conservatory to the violin division by Professor Eduard Grach and Associate Professor Tatiana Berkul. When he was studying at the conservatory, he took part in the Keshet Eilon Summer Mastercourses in Israel, under the guidance of Ida Haendel and Shlomo Mintz. Furthermore, the young violinist had started playing in the Moscovia Chamber Orchestra and consequently passed all stages up to the concertmaster position.

In 2001 Boriso-Glebsky became an artist of the Moscow Philharmonic Society. Two years later, aged eighteen, he turned to perform as a soloist. In 2005 he started on postgraduate studies and research on the English violin music from the nineteen and twentieth centuries. He also took courses outside Russia, particularly by Augustin Dumay in the Queen Elisabeth Music Chapel, and by Ana Chumachenco in the Kronberg Academy. In Belgium Boriso-Glebsky was given for performing the violin II Patti by Antonio Stradivari that let him take part in prestigious contests further.

Career

Music profession 
Boriso-Glebsky has a varied musical repertoire and has performed several compositions of classical music, including works from: Johann Sebastian Bach, Antonio Vivaldi, Wolfgang Amadeus Mozart, Ludwig van Beethoven, and many more. Boriso-Glebsky has also performed works from many musicians of the twentieth century, including Benjamin Britten, Sergei Prokofiev, and Béla Bartók. Boriso-Glebsky has performed regularly in Russia and abroad. Some of the festivals that he has taken part in include Salzburg Festival, Rheingau Musik Festival, and Les Sons Intensifs (Lessines).

On 19 June 2002, he represented  at the Eurovision Young Musicians 2002, which was held in Berlin, Germany. In 2014 Boriso-Glebsky, along with Solenne Païdassi, Dana Zemstov, David Cohen, Uxía Martínez Botana, and Andreas Hering, founded the Rubik Ensemble, based on the ideology of the six edges and colours of the Rubik's Cube.

In 2010, Boriso-Glebsky presented two concert programmes called "Three Tchaikovskys" which broadcast concerts written by Pyotr Tchaikovsky, Boris Tchaikovsky and Alexander Tchaikovsky. These concerts took place in Moscow and Saint Petersburg.

Contest judging 
Boriso-Glebsky has acted as a professional juror at several competitions. In 2014 he was a jury member at the National Russian Music Competition, held in Moscow; and at the International Vladimir Spivakov Violin Competition, held in the Bashkortostan capital, Ufa, in 2016.

Discography

Awards and achievements

References

External links 

 Nikita Borisoglebsky, profile at Moscow Philharmonic Society website

Russian violinists
Male classical violinists
Russian classical violinists
Living people
1985 births
People from Volgodonsk
21st-century classical violinists
21st-century Russian male musicians